The Red Sticks were paramilitary organisation in Central Asia, formed by the Soviets to combat the basmachi rebels.

The historian Joshua Kunitz quotes a contemporary account:  "There are, we are told, sixty thousand Red Sticks in Tadjikistan. Most of them have no firearms, but they carry heavy cudgels, knives, and other weapons when they go out into the hills in search of the Basmachi."

References

20th century in Tajikistan
Paramilitary organizations based in the Soviet Union
Soviet Central Asia